This is a list of high schools in the U.S. state of Virginia.

Accomack County
 Arcadia High School, Oak Hall
 Chincoteague High School, Chincoteague
 Nandua High School, Onley

Albemarle County

Charlottesville

 Albemarle High School
 The Covenant School
 Monticello High School
 Murray High School
 Renaissance School
 St. Anne's-Belfield School
 Tandem Friends School

Crozet

 The Miller School of Albemarle
 Western Albemarle High School

Alexandria City

 Alexandria City High School 
 Bishop Ireton High School
 Episcopal High School
 St. Stephen's and St. Agnes School

Alleghany County
 Alleghany High School, Covington

Amelia County
 Amelia Academy, Amelia Court House
 Amelia County High School, Amelia Court House

Amherst County
 Amherst County High School, Amherst

Appomattox County
 Appomattox County High School, Appomattox

Arlington County

Arlington

 Arlington Career Center
 Bishop Denis J. O'Connell High School
 H-B Woodlawn Secondary Program
 Wakefield High School
 Washington-Liberty High School
 Yorktown High School

Augusta County

 Buffalo Gap High School, Swoope
 Fishburne Military School, Waynesboro
 Fort Defiance High School, Fort Defiance
 Wilson Memorial High School, Fishersville

Staunton

 Riverheads High School
 Stuart Hall School

Stuarts Draft

 Ridgeview Christian School
 Stuarts Draft High School

Bath County
 Bath County High School, Hot Springs

Bedford County
 Jefferson Forest High School, Forest
 Liberty High School, Bedford
 Staunton River High School, Moneta

Bland County
 Bland County High School, Bland

Botetourt County
 James River High School, Buchanan
 Lord Botetourt High School, Daleville

Bristol City
 Virginia High School, Bristol

Brunswick County

Lawrenceville
 Brunswick High School
 Brunswick Academy

Buchanan County
 Council High School, Council
 Grundy Senior High School, Grundy
 Hurley High School, Hurley
 Twin Valley High School, Pilgrim Knob

Buckingham County
 Buckingham County High School, Buckingham

Buena Vista City
 Parry McCluer High School, Buena Vista

Campbell County

 Altavista High School, Altavista
 Brookville High School, Lynchburg
 William Campbell High School, Naruna

Rustburg

 Campbell County Technical Center
 Rustburg High School

Caroline County
 Caroline High School, Milford
 The Carmel School, Ruther Glen

Carroll County

Hillsville
 Carroll County High School
 New Life Christian Academy

Charles City County
 Charles City County High School, Charles City

Charlotte County
 Randolph-Henry High School, Charlotte Court House

Charlottesville City
 Charlottesville High School, Charlottesville

Chesapeake City

 Atlantic Shores Christian School
 Deep Creek High School
 Grassfield High School
 Great Bridge High School
 Great Hope Baptist High School
 Greenbrier Christian Academy
 Hickory High School
 Indian River High School
 Oscar F. Smith High School
 StoneBridge School
 Western Branch High School

Chesterfield County

 Career & Technical Center @ Courthouse, North Chesterfield
 Matoaca High School, Matoaca

Chester

 Carver College & Career Academy
 Thomas Dale High School

Chesterfield

 Lloyd C. Bird High School
 Richmond Christian School

Midlothian

 Al Madina School of Richmond
 Career & Technical Center @ Hull
 Clover Hill High School
 Cosby High School
 James River High School
 Manchester High School
 Midlothian High School

Richmond

 Banner Christian School
 Meadowbrook High School
 Monacan High School

Clarke County
 Clarke County High School, Berryville

Colonial Heights City
 Colonial Heights High School, Colonial Heights

Covington City
 Covington High School, Covington

Craig County
 Craig County High School, New Castle

Culpeper County

Culpeper

 Culpeper County High School
 Eastern View High School

Cumberland County
 Cumberland High School, Cumberland

Danville City

 Galileo Magnet High School
 George Washington High School
 Piedmont Governor's School for Mathematics, Science, and Technology
 Westover Christian Academy

Dickenson County
 Ridgeview High School, Clintwood

Dinwiddie County
 Dinwiddie County High School, Dinwiddie

Emporia City
 Greensville County High School

Essex County

Tappahannock

 Essex High School (Virginia)
 St. Margaret's School (Virginia)

Fairfax City

 Fairfax High School
 Paul VI Catholic High School
 The New School of Northern Virginia

Fairfax County

 Annandale High School, Annandale
 Centreville High School, Clifton
 Herndon High School, Herndon
 Lake Braddock Secondary School, Burke
 South County Secondary School, Lorton

Alexandria

 Bryant Alternative High School
 Thomas A. Edison High School
 Hayfield Secondary School
 Thomas Jefferson High School for Science and Technology
 Mount Vernon High School
 West Potomac High School

Chantilly

 Chantilly High School
 Westfield High School

Fairfax

 Fairfax High School
 Robinson Secondary School
 WT Woodson High School
 Trinity Christian School

Falls Church

 Falls Church High School
 Justice High School
 Marshall High School
 Trinity School at Meadow View

McLean

 Langley High School
 The Madeira School
 McLean High School
 Potomac School

Oakton

 Dominion Christian School
 Flint Hill School

Reston

 South Lakes High School
 Oak Hill Christian School

Springfield

 GW Community School
 John R. Lewis High School
 West Springfield High School

Vienna

 Fairfax Christian School
 James Madison High School
 Oakton High School

City of, Falls Church
 Meridian High School (formerly George Mason High School)

Fauquier County

 Fresta Valley Christian School, Marshall
 Kettle Run High School, Nokesville
 Liberty High School, Bealeton
 The Wakefield School, The Plains

Warrenton

 Fauquier High School
 Highland School
 Mountain Vista Governor's School

Floyd County
 Floyd County High School, Floyd

Fluvanna County
 Fluvanna High School, Palmyra
 Fork Union Military Academy, Fork Union

Franklin City
 Franklin High School, Franklin

Franklin County
 Franklin County High School, Rocky Mount

Frederick County

 Sherando High School, Stephens City
 Mountain Vista Governor's School, Middletown

Winchester

 James Wood High School
 Millbrook High School

Fredericksburg City
 James Monroe High School, Fredericksburg

Galax City
 Galax High School, Galax

Giles County

 Giles High School, Pearisburg
 Jefferson Christian Academy, Ripplemead
 Narrows High School, Narrows

Gloucester County
 Gloucester High School, Gloucester

Goochland County
 Goochland High School, Goochland

Manakin

 Benedictine High School
 Saint Gertrude High School

Grayson County
 Grayson County High School, Independence
 Oak Hill Academy, Mouth of Wilson

Greene County
 Blue Ridge School, St. George
 William Monroe High School, Stanardsville

Greensville County
 Greensville County High School, Emporia

Halifax County
 Halifax County High School, South Boston

Hampton City

 Bethel High School
 Bridgeport Academy
 Hampton Christian Schools
 Hampton High School
 Kecoughtan High School
 Phoebus High School

Hanover County
 Patrick Henry High School, Ashland

Mechanicsville

 Atlee High School
 Grace Christian School
 Hanover High School
 Mechanicsville High School

Harrisonburg City
 Eastern Mennonite School
 Harrisonburg High School

Henrico County
 Highland Springs High School, Highland Springs
 The Steward School, Henrico

Glen Allen

 Deep Run High School
 Glen Allen High School

Richmond

 Douglas S. Freeman High School
 Henrico High School
 Hermitage High School
 J.R. Tucker High School
 Landmark Christian School
 Mills E. Godwin High School
 Varina High School

Henry County
 Bassett High School, Bassett
 Magna Vista High School, Ridgeway

Highland County
 Highland High School, Monterey

Hopewell City
 Hopewell High School
 West End Christian School

Isle of Wight County

 Smithfield High School, Smithfield
 Windsor High School, Windsor
 Isle of Wight Academy, Isle of Wight

James City County
NB: James City County and the City of Williamsburg operate a joint school system. All of the district's high schools have "Williamsburg" postal addresses, but are located in the County.
 Jamestown High School, Williamsburg
 Lafayette High School, Williamsburg
 Warhill High School, Williamsburg (opened in 2007)

King and Queen County
 Central High School, King and Queen Court House

King George County
 King George High School, King George

King William County
 King William High School, King William
 West Point High School, West Point

Lancaster County
 Lancaster High School, Lancaster

Lee County
 Lee High School, Jonesville
 Thomas Walker High School, Ewing

Lexington City
 No public high school; see Rockbridge County

Loudoun County

 Foxcroft School, Middleburg
 Freedom High School, South Riding

Aldie

 John Champe High School
 Lightridge High School

Ashburn

 Briar Woods High School
 Broad Run High School
 Independence High School
 Ideal Schools High School
 Rock Ridge High School
 Stone Bridge High School

Leesburg

 Heritage High School
 Loudoun County High School
 Riverside High School
 Tuscarora High School

Purcellville

 Loudoun Valley High School
 Woodgrove High School

Sterling

 Dominion High School
 Park View High School
 Potomac Falls High School

Louisa County
 Louisa County High School, Mineral

Lunenburg County
 Central High School, Victoria

Lynchburg City

 E. C. Glass High School
 Heritage High School
 Liberty Christian Academy
 Central Virginia Governor's School for Science and Technology
 Virginia Episcopal School

Madison County
 Madison County High School, Madison
 Woodberry Forest School, Woodberry Forest

Manassas City
 Osbourn High School
 Seton High School

Manassas Park City
 Manassas Park High School, Manassas Park

Martinsville City
 Martinsville High School, Martinsville

Mathews County
 Mathews High School,  Mathews

Mecklenburg County
 Bluestone High School, Skipwith
 Park View High School, South Hill

Middlesex County
 Christchurch School, Christchurch
 Middlesex High School, Saluda

Montgomery County

 Auburn High School, Riner
 Blacksburg High School, Blacksburg
 Christiansburg High School, Christiansburg
 Eastern Montgomery High School, Elliston

Nelson County
 Nelson County High School, Lovingston

New Kent County
 New Kent High School, New Kent

Newport News City

 Denbigh Baptist Christian School
 Denbigh High School
 Hampton Roads Academy
 Heritage High School
 Menchville High School
 Peninsula Catholic High School
 Warwick High School
 Woodside High School

Norfolk City

 Granby High School
 The Hague School
 Lake Taylor High School
 Matthew Fontaine Maury High School
 Norfolk Academy
 Norfolk Christian High School
 Norfolk Collegiate School
 Norview High School
 Booker T. Washington High School

Northampton County
 Broadwater Academy, Exmore
 Northampton High School, Eastville

Northumberland County
 Northumberland High School, Heathsville

Norton City
 John I. Burton High School, Norton

Nottoway County
 Nottoway County High School, Nottoway
 Kenston Forest School, Blackstone

Orange County
 Orange County High School, Orange
 Woodberry Forest School, Woodberry Forest

Page County
 Page County High School, Shenandoah

Luray
 Luray High School
 Mt. Carmel Christian Academy

Patrick County
 Patrick County High School, Stuart

Petersburg City
 Petersburg High School
 Appomattox Regional Governor's School for the Arts And Technology

Pittsylvania County

 Dan River High School, Ringgold
 Gretna High School, Gretna
 Tunstall High School, Dry Fork

Chatham

 Chatham Hall
 Chatham High School
 Hargrave Military Academy

Poquoson City
 Poquoson High School, Poquoson

Portsmouth City

 Churchland High School
 I.C. Norcom High School
 Manor High School
 Portsmouth Christian School

Powhatan County

Powhatan
 Blessed Sacrament Huguenot
 Powhatan High School

Prince Edward County

Farmville
 Fuqua School
 Prince Edward County High School

Prince George County
 Prince George High School, Prince George

Prince William County

 Battlefield High School, Haymarket
 Gainesville High School, Gainesville
 Gar-Field Senior High School, Dale City
Quantico Middle/High School, Marine Corps Base Quantico

Dumfries

 Potomac High School
 Saint John Paul the Great Catholic High School

Manassas

 Charles J. Colgan Sr. High School
 Osbourn Park High School
 Unity Reed High School

Nokesville

 Brentsville District High School
 Patriot High School

Woodbridge

 Forest Park High School
 Freedom High School
 Hylton High School
 Richard Milburn High School
 Woodbridge High School

Pulaski County
 Pulaski County High School, Dublin

Radford City
 Radford High School, Radford

Rappahannock County
 Rappahannock County High School, Washington
 Wakefield Country Day School, Huntly

Richmond City

 Armstrong High School
 Collegiate School
 Franklin Military School
 George Wythe High School
 Huguenot High School
 John Marshall High School
 Maggie L. Walker Governor's School for Government and International Studies
 Northstar Academy
 Open High School
 Richmond Community High School
 St. Catherine's School
 St. Christopher's School
 Thomas Jefferson High School
 Trinity Episcopal High School

Richmond County
 Rappahannock High School, Warsaw

Roanoke City

 Blue Ridge Technical Academy
 Noel C. Taylor Learning Academy
 Patrick Henry High School
 Roanoke Catholic School
 Roanoke Valley Governor's School for Science and Technology
 William Fleming High School

Roanoke County
 William Byrd High School, Vinton

Roanoke

 Cave Spring High School
 Hidden Valley High School
 North Cross School
 Northside High School
 Roanoke Valley Christian Schools

Salem

 Arnold R. Burton Technology Center
 Glenvar High School

Rockbridge County
 Rockbridge County High School, Lexington

Rockingham County

 Turner Ashby High School, Bridgewater
 Broadway High School, Broadway
 Spotswood High School, Penn Laird
 East Rockingham High School, Elkton

Russell County

 Castlewood High School, Castlewood
 Honaker High School, Honaker
Lebanon High School, Lebanon

Salem City
 Salem High School

Scott County

 Gate City High School, Gate City
 Rye Cove High School, Clinchport
 Twin Springs High School, Nickelsville

Shenandoah County

 Shenandoah Valley Academy, New Market
 Stonewall Jackson High School, Quicksburg
 Strasburg High School, Strasburg

Woodstock

 Central High School
 Massanutten Military Academy

Smyth County

 Chilhowie High School, Chilhowie
 Marion Senior High School, Marion
 Northwood High School, Saltville

Southampton County

Courtland
 Southampton Academy
 Southampton High School

Spotsylvania County

Fredericksburg

 Chancellor High School
 Faith Baptist School
 Fredericksburg Academy
 Fredericksburg Christian School
 Massaponax High School

Spotsylvania

 Courtland High School
 Riverbend High School
 Spotsylvania High School

Stafford County

Stafford

 Brooke Point High School
 Colonial Forge High School
 Grace Preparatory School
 Mountain View High School
 North Stafford High School

Fredericksburg
 Stafford Senior High School

Staunton City
 Staunton High School

Suffolk City

 King's Fork High School
 Lakeland High School
 Nansemond River High School
 Nansemond-Suffolk Academy

Surry County
 Surry County High School, Dendron

Sussex County
 Sussex Central High School, Sussex
 Tidewater Academy, Wakefield

Tazewell County

 Graham High School, Bluefield
 Richlands High School, Richlands
 Tazewell High School, Tazewell

Virginia Beach City

 Bayside High School
 Cape Henry Collegiate School
 Catholic High School
 Chesapeake Bay Academy
 First Colonial High School
 Frank W. Cox High School
 Floyd E. Kellam High School
 Green Run High School
 Kempsville High School
 Landstown High School
 Ocean Lakes High School
 Princess Anne High School
 Salem High School
 Tallwood High School

Warren County

Front Royal

 Randolph-Macon Academy
 Skyline High School
 Warren County High School

Washington County

 Abingdon High School, Abingdon
 John S. Battle High School, Bristol
 Patrick Henry High School, Glade Spring
Holston High School, Damascus

Waynesboro City
 Waynesboro High School

Westmoreland County
 Colonial Beach High School, Colonial Beach
 Washington and Lee High School, Montross

Williamsburg City
NB: The City of Williamsburg and James City County operate a joint school system. None of the system's two, soon to be three, public high schools are located in the City. See James City County for the public high schools.
 Walsingham Academy, Williamsburg

Winchester City
 John Handley High School, Winchester

Wise County

 Union High School, Big Stone Gap
 Eastside High School, Coeburn

Wise

 Central High School
 Wise County Christian School

Wythe County

 Fort Chiswell High School, Max Meadows
 Rural Retreat High School, Rural Retreat
 George Wythe High School, Wytheville

York County
 Bruton High School, Williamsburg

Yorktown

 Grafton High School
 Summit Christian Academy
 Tabb High School
 York High School

See also
 List of school divisions in Virginia

References

External links
 List of high schools in Virginia from SchoolTree.org

 
Virginia
High schools